Tea for Two may refer to:

 "Tea for Two" (song), a 1924 popular song by Vincent Youmans and Irving Caesar
 Tea for Two (album) (1950), a Doris Day album
 Tea for Two (film) (1950), a movie starring Doris Day
 Tea for Two (TV series), Australian television series
 Tahiti Trot, Op. 16, Dmitri Shostakovich's 1927 orchestration of "Tea for Two"

See also
Tee for Two (1945), a 1945 Tom and Jerry cartoon